Hyposmocoma haleakalae is a species of moth of the family Cosmopterigidae. It was first described by Arthur Gardiner Butler in 1881. It is endemic to the Hawaiian island of Maui.

External links

haleakalae
Endemic moths of Hawaii
Moths described in 1881